Johann "Hans" Grugger (born 13 December 1981 in Bad Hofgastein, Austria) is a  former World Cup alpine ski racer, competing in the speed disciplines of downhill and super-G. He made his World Cup debut on 29 November 2003, in the downhill at Lake Louise, and finished seventh. He won his first World Cup race in Bormio, Italy on 29 December, 2004. Exactly one year later at Bormio, he crashed and had to drop out of the season due to the acquired injuries. However, he managed to come back to reach podium positions in 2007, including a victory in the super-G at Kvitfjell, Norway.

Grugger made his first Olympic team in 2010 in Vancouver and finished 22nd in the downhill at Whistler Creekside.

On 20 January, 2011, Grugger crashed during a downhill training run at Kitzbühel and suffered a serious head injury.  He was airlifted to Innsbruck and placed into an induced coma. Grugger suffered a severe head trauma by crashing head-first onto the ski piste after a long jump. On 18 March 2011 he left the rehab clinic two months earlier due to his fast recovery progress. He says he will be skiing again, but it is uncertain whether he will ever ski again competitively. Grugger's accident triggered discussions over safety in downhill skiing. In April 2012 at the age of 30, he announced that he would retire and not continue to pursue his comeback.

World Cup podiums

Season standings

References

External links
 
 Hans Grugger World Cup standings at the International Ski Federation
 
 
 Grugger.at - personal website

1981 births
Austrian male alpine skiers
Living people
Alpine skiers at the 2010 Winter Olympics
Olympic alpine skiers of Austria